The Acts of Parliament (Commencement) Act 1793 (33 Geo. 3 c. 13) is an Act of the Parliament of the Kingdom of Great Britain which requires that the clerk of the Parliaments endorse every act of Parliament with the date on which the act passed and the date on which the same received royal assent and that the date is part of the act. The act formerly stated that such date was when the act would come into force unless the relevant act specified some other date instead of the first day of the session in which they were passed. The commencement part of the Act was repealed by the Interpretation Act 1978 and replaced with Section 4 of the same Act, which says the same thing as the repealed portion of the 1793 Act.

Commencement of Acts of Parliament prior to this Act

Previously, most Acts of Parliament were ex post facto laws,  meaning that they were deemed to have come into force on the first day of the session in which they were passed (because of the legal fiction that a session lasted one day). This meant, prior to the enactment of this Act, that all Acts had come into force retroactively some as much as a year before they were actually passed. The preamble to the  Commencement Act said that this historic practice was liable to produce "great and manifest injustice".

Provisions of this Act

This Act provides that it applies to Acts of Parliament passed after 8 April 1793.

Endorsement of Acts with the date of royal assent

This Act imposes a duty on the Clerk of the Parliaments to endorse any Act which passes with the date ("the day, month and year") on which that Act passed and received royal assent. It provides that the date must be written, in English, immediately after the title of that Act, and that that endorsement is part of the endorsed Act.

Commencement of Acts

This Act originally provided that the endorsed Act was to come into force on the date specified by the endorsement, where no other commencement was specified by the endorsed Act. The relevant words were repealed on 1 January 1979 and have been replaced by section 4 of the Interpretation Act 1978, which says the same thing.

Dating of Acts
Because of the fiction that an Act had come into force on the first day of the session, it was also the convention in citing a pre-1793 Act to date it to the year in which the session had commenced. In the context of modern historical writing, however, it is more usual to date Acts (especially well-known and historically significant Acts) to the actual year in which they passed through Parliament. This leads to discrepancies in the way in which the same Act may be cited or referred to: for example, the Act of Uniformity (1 Eliz 1 c 2) is often dated to 1558 in legal contexts, but to 1559 in historical contexts; the Toleration Act (1 Will & Mary c 18) to 1688 in legal contexts, but 1689 in historical contexts; the Bill of Rights (1 Will & Mary sess 2 c 2) to 1688 in legal contexts, but 1689 in historical contexts; and the Union with Scotland Act (6 Anne c 11) to 1706 in legal contexts, but 1707 in historical contexts. The Calendar (New Style) Act 1750 (24 Geo.II c.23, Assented 17 May 1751) is known in US usage as the British Calendar Act of 1751, which may cause some confusion since there was also a Calendar Act 1751 (25 GeoII c.30) to amend the 1750 Act.

See also
Ex post facto law
Coming into force
Acts of Parliament (Commencement) Act (Ireland) 1795

References
Halsbury's Statutes. Fourth Edition. 2008 Reissue. Volume 41. Page 701.

External links
The Acts of Parliament (Commencement) Act 1793, as amended, from the National Archives.
Royal Assent Procedure

Great Britain Acts of Parliament 1793
Ex post facto law